Apostibes deckerti is a moth of the family Scythrididae. It was described by Bengt Å. Bengtsson in 2014. It is found in Kenya, Namibia and Yemen.

References

Scythrididae
Moths described in 2014
Moths of Africa
Moths of the Arabian Peninsula